Valdespino was founded in 1430 and is one of Spain's oldest sherry and Spanish wine producers. The bodega is located in Jerez de la Frontera and produces a range of sherries. From 1883 it has been an official provider to the Spanish monarchy.

Bodegas Valdespino forms a part of Grupo Estévez.

References

External links
Official website

Wineries of Spain